Wang Huiyuan is a male former international table tennis player from China.

Table tennis career
From 1979 to 1985 he won several medals in singles, doubles, and team events in the Asian Table Tennis Championships and six medals in the World Table Tennis Championships.

The six World Championship medals  included two gold medals in the team event for China.

He also won an English Open title.

See also
 List of table tennis players
 List of World Table Tennis Championships medalists

References

Living people
Chinese male table tennis players
Table tennis players from Shenyang
Year of birth missing (living people)